Zhuravlyovka is a rural locality (a selo) in Kasatkinsky Selsoviet of Arkharinsky District, Amur Oblast, Russia. The population was 171 in 2018. There are 2 streets.

Geography 
Zhuravlyovka is located 53 km south of Arkhara (the district's administrative centre) by road. Kasatkino is the nearest rural locality.

References 

Rural localities in Arkharinsky District